Baba Jani-ye Shah Morad (also Romanized as Bābā Jānī-ye Shāh Morād; also known as Bābā Jānī) is a village in Ban Zardeh Rural District, in the Central District of Dalahu County, Kermanshah Province, Iran. At the 2006 census, its population was 225, in 51 families.

References 

Populated places in Dalahu County